Baboon is an album by Baboon.  It was self-released in 2006.  All songs were written by Baboon.

Track listing
 "Airplane" – 4:31
 "Breaking Glass" – 4:26
 "Saturday" – 4:06
 "Dracula Eyes" – 4:48
 "Arms Around the World" – 4:59
 "Into the Sea" – 2:33
 "Light of the Lightning Strike" – 3:56
 "Surround" – 5:32
 "Accidents Are Waiting to Happen" – 3:19
 "Circles" – 4:37
 "Waiting for the Rain" – 4:31
 "Can't Be Wrong" – 6:49

All songs by Baboon.

Personnel
 Steven Barnett - drums
 James Henderson - guitar, backing vocals, keyboards
 Andrew Huffstetler - lead vocals
 Mark Hughes - bass, backing vocals
 Mike Rudnicki - guitar, backing vocals
 Rob Wechsler - mastering
 Baboon - cover concept
 Darren Paul - art direction
 Danna Berger (Band) - photography
 Tim Becker - photography
 D. Muller - photography
 Nellie Buir - photography
 Nic Taylor - photography
 Dimitris Kritsotakis - photography
 Kenn Kiser - photography
 Rikard Sigvardsson - photography

References

2006 albums
Baboon (band) albums